Heart of Gold (Spanish:Alma de Dios) is a 1923 Spanish silent film directed by Manuel Noriega and starring Irene Alba, Juan Bonafé and Elisa Ruiz Romero. It was remade in 1941 under the same title.

Cast
 Irene Alba as Ezequiela  
 Juan Bonafé  as Matías  
 Elisa Ruiz Romero  as Eloísa  
 María Fuster de Rusell 
 Lia Emo de Echaide  as Marcelina  
 Javier de Rivera as Agustín 
 Juan Nadal as Adrián  
 Antonio Zaballos as Pelegrín  
 Carmen Cremades as La gitana 
 Santiago García
 Sita Iroz
 Ramón Meca
 Lina Moreno
 Maruja Retana
 Arturo Robles  
 Emilio Ruiz Santiago 
 Antonia Ruiz 
 Manuel Russell

References

Bibliography
 Bentley, Bernard. A Companion to Spanish Cinema. Boydell & Brewer 2008.

External links

1923 films
Spanish silent films
Films based on works by Carlos Arniches
Spanish black-and-white films